The 1976–77 Liga Alef season was the first in which Liga Alef was the third tier of Israeli football due to the formation of Liga Artzit.

Hapoel Tirat HaCarmel (champions of the North Division) and Hapoel Beit Shemesh (champions of the South Division) won the title and promotion to Liga Artzit.

North Division

South Division

References
Memo no. 152 IFA 
Mahane Yehuda won, but relegated with Safed to Liga Bet Davar, 22.5.77, Historical Jewish Press 
Beit Shemesh separated from Liga Alef with 1:2 defeat in Ashkelon Davar, 29.5.77, Historical Jewish Press 

Liga Alef seasons
Israel
3